Edaville Railroad (also branded Edaville USA and Edaville Family Theme Park) is a heritage railroad and amusement park in South Carver, Massachusetts, opened in 1947, and temporally closed during the COVID-19 pandemic in 2020. The park was only open for the Christmastime season in 2021, and will reopen under new ownership for the 2022 Christmastime season (see history section). It is one of the oldest heritage railroad operations in the United States. It is a  narrow gauge line that operates excursion trains for tourists, built by the late Ellis D. Atwood (initials E.D.A., for which Edaville is named) on his sprawling cranberry plantation in Southeastern Massachusetts.

History

Conception and opening

Atwood purchased two locomotives and most of the passenger and freight cars when the Bridgton and Saco River Railroad was dismantled in 1941. After World War II he acquired two former Monson Railroad locomotives and some surviving cars from the defunct Sandy River and Rangeley Lakes Railroad in Maine. This equipment ran on  narrow gauge tracks, as opposed to the more common  narrow gauge in the western United States.  Atwood purchased the equipment for use on his  cranberry plantation in South Carver.  After the 1945 cranberry harvest, Atwood's employees built  of track atop the levees around the cranberry bogs. Sand and supplies were hauled in to the bogs, and cranberries were transported to a "screen house" where they were dried and then sent to market. Atwood's neighbors were enchanted with the diminutive railroad.  At first, Atwood offered rides for free.  When the demand for rides soared, he charged a nickel a ride.  Eventually the line became less of a working railroad and more of a tourist attraction.

Atwood died in 1950, the result of injuries he received when the oil burner in the screen house exploded.  His widow Elthea and nephew Dave Eldridge carried on operations at Edaville until the railroad was purchased in 1957 by F. Nelson Blount, a railroad enthusiast who had made a fortune in the seafood processing business.  The Atwood Estate retained ownership of the land over which the railroad operated, a key point in later years. Blount operated Edaville for the next decade, hauling tourists behind his favorite engine #8 and displaying his ever-growing collection of  locomotives.  Among these was the Boston and Maine Railroad's Flying Yankee. This helped form the basis for his Steamtown, USA collection, first operating at Keene, New Hampshire before moving to Bellows Falls, Vermont. (It would later move and be reconstituted as the Steamtown National Historic Site in Scranton, Pennsylvania.)

Blount also leased some of the 2 ft equipment from Edaville to operate at two theme parks in the Northeast: C. V. Wood's Freedomland U.S.A. in the Bronx, New York, and Pleasure Island in Wakefield, Massachusetts. The trains leased to Freedomland were operated under the Santa Fe Rail Road attraction. The company that operated the actual Santa Fe Rail Road sponsored the train rides. The trains consisted of steam engines Monson #3 and Monson #4, passenger cars and caboose cars. They trains were delivered to Freedomland each spring and returned to Edaville when the park closed for the season in September or October. The engines now can be found in separate museums in Maine.

1967–91
Nelson Blount died in the crash of his light airplane over Labor Day weekend in 1967.  Blount's friend and right-hand man Fred Richardson continued on as general manager until the railroad was sold to George E. Bartholomew, a former Edaville employee, in 1970.

Edaville continued operations for another two decades with Bartholomew at the helm. The railroad operated tourist trains from Memorial Day thru Labor Day plus a brief, but spectacular, Festival of Lights in December.  In the 1980s, Bartholomew's attention was divided between the narrow gauge Edaville, and the  Bay Colony Railroad he was then forming, running over disused Conrail branch lines.  To some observers and former employees, Edaville began to stagnate around this time, although the annual Christmas Festival of Lights continued to draw huge crowds.

In the late 1980s, after Mrs. Atwood died and the Atwood Estate evicted Edaville, Bartholomew was forced to cease operations.  He eventually put the railroad up for sale in 1991.

1992–2005
Edaville ceased operations in January 1992 and much of the equipment was sold to a group in Portland, Maine led by businessman Phineas T. Sprague.  The equipment was to be the basis of the newly formed Maine Narrow Gauge Railroad Museum along the shores of Casco Bay.   The sale generated great rancor.   Many of the railroad's employees were not ready to give up on South Carver.  Much of the contents of the museum, housed in the former screen house, had been auctioned off the previous fall.  But the sale was closed (although the Portland museum took on a debt that would prove all but crushing in subsequent years) and locomotives 3,4 and 8 were trucked to Portland aboard antique trucks loaned for the occasion.  Locomotive #7, which was owned by Louis Edmonds, left for Maine at a later date.

Two attempts to revive Edaville during the 1990s foundered.  The Edaville Entertainment Group formed an ambitious business plan to revive the park, but their relationship with the Atwood Estate (upon which the tracks were laid) turned sour.  The group briefly considered moving the park to a parcel in Freetown, Massachusetts, but eventually they abandoned their effort.

South Carver Rail, led by former Edaville employees (and engineers) Paul Hallet and Rick Knight, operated the hastily refurbished #7 for Fred Richardson's 80th birthday at Edaville, and ran trains during the Cranberry Festival over a Columbus Day Weekend in the mid-1990s, even managing to borrow Monson #3 from Maine.  Ultimately their efforts to reopen the park failed, and it was the last time that the "original" Edaville locomotives ran over the line.

In 1999, the new Edaville Railroad opened for operation.  Owned and operated by construction company owner Jack Flagg, developer John Delli Priscoli and cranberry grower Douglas Beaton, the railroad acquired a 'new' steam locomotive, #21 "Anne Elizabeth", built by the English firm of Hudswell Clarke and a veteran of the Fiji sugar industry.  Several of the original Edaville buildings, including the station and the engine house, were demolished with new buildings taking their place.  Plans called for the construction of a roundhouse, served by the original turntable, with an enlarged collection of locomotives and rolling stock.

During December 2000, the wheels on one of a car's four axles came off the tracks, causing a derailment.
On November 25, 2001, the same exact thing happened. A Weymouth family was jolted when the train car they were riding in derailed and slid into the dirt.

2005–2022
By 2005, Edaville Railroad and the land upon which it ran was now owned by a single man:  Jon Delli Priscoli. He bought up the Atwood property, bought out partner Jack Flagg, and became the sole owner.  Although this removed the railroad/landlord conflict that had plagued Edaville for decades, it proved to be the end of the "old" Edaville.  Delli Priscoli turned the land near the milepost known as "Mt. Urann" into a housing subdivision, and pulled up the tracks that ran through the new lots.  Late 2005 saw the very last run over the "original line" (pulled by oil-burner #21, which had been cosmetically modified to more closely resemble a Maine prototype).  When the rails were removed over Mt. Urann,  the  mainline became a  loop, including about half of the line around the old reservoir.

In late 2010, the Edaville operators announced that they would not seek to renew their operating lease with Delli Priscoli.  Delli Priscoli then put the railroad up for sale for $10 million, and eventually found a potential buyer. However, Priscolli found that the buyer did not intend to continue operating the park, and declined the offer, opting instead to rebuild the park. The restored railroad reopened in September 2011. The following year, the park began a three-year reconstruction project, which includes the installation of additional attractions, refurbishing and repainting existing rides, adding additional parking, and building a new main street entrance and guest services area

As of April 13, 2022, Delli Priscoli put Edaville back on the market. "The family amusement park closed due to the coronavirus pandemic, and except for the return of the annual Christmas Festival of Lights late last year, has remain closed. Delli Priscoli said Edaville fell into the final COVID-19 reopening phase and has not received any federal or local financial relief. ... One option he is exploring is an expansion referred to as Edaville 2.0, showcasing a year-round facility with the expansion of indoor and outdoor venues featuring shopping, dining and entertainment. In addition to transitioning Edaville to new ownership, Priscoli will work to reposition a portion of the land holdings not central to the park for a master-planned residential development to meet Carver’s requirement to follow the MBTA’s community zoning initiative for a 50-acre parcel for multifamily housing or he will pursue a Chapter 40B affordable housing project on the site. ... While he hopes to have a new owner in place later this summer, he is planning to reopen it himself one last time."

2022–present
On August 10th, 2022, Edavile was off the market, and new operators were announced. "Rest assured, Edaville is no longer for sale," the park said in a Facebook post. "The new operators, Shervin B. Hawley, Managing Partner of Sudbury, MA, and Brian Fanslau, Operations Partner and owner of Maine Locomotive & Machine Works of Alna, ME, are committed to the long-term success of Edaville as a traditional family park centered on its historic steam locomotives and family-oriented activities." In an effort for the park for the Christmastime season, Dino Land and Thomas Land will not be open for the 2022 season. However, a new "European-Style Christmas Market," new and old shops, as well as many attractions and rides not part of Dino Land and Thomas Land. Additionally, a new pricing structure will be used, including an option for a season pass.

Current era

Heritage railroad

Edaville's two-foot gauge railroad is still in use during the summer and fall months, offering daily excursions through the surrounding cranberry bogs and special holiday-themed excursions during the late fall and early winter. Typical trains consist of six to eight enclosed passenger cars, one open-top passenger car, and an enclosed caboose, all powered by a diesel engine and usually being led by an unpowered "engine" reminiscent of Thomas the Tank Engine.

Amusement park

In 2001, Edaville Railroad reopened under the rebranding Edaville Family Theme Park, an amusement park themed around cranberry harvesting and railroading. Initially consisting of one region containing a few dozen rides and the signature heritage railroad, the park underwent several years of construction from 2004 to 2007, which included the construction of two adjacent regions with additional rides and attractions, as well as an overhaul of the main region. As of 2020, the park consists of three large interconnected areas, each with different themes. The main area, referred to as "Cran Central", features 32 amusement rides primarily (but not exclusively) themed around cranberry harvesting, including a ferris wheel and tilt-a-whirl. Cran Central also houses the park's main train station, where passengers board and disembark.

The second region is a large dinosaur-themed attraction entitled "Dino-Land", which opened in 2014. Open primarily during the summer and fall months, Dino-Land contains a staff-guided walking trail through woodlands featuring 23 life-sized animatronic dinosaurs, as well as a variety of dinosaur-themed games, retail, and activities.

The third region, entitled "Thomas Land USA", opened in 2015, and is based on the British children's television series Thomas & Friends, especially the Island of Sodor. Thomas Land has 11 rides, most of which are based on those from England's Thomas Land, and features characters including Harold the Helicopter, Cranky the Crane, Toby and the Troublesome Trucks. The park includes audio-animatronic trains, a stage show and  dining locations.

See also

 List of amusement parks in New England
 List of heritage railroads in the United States
 Rail transport in Walt Disney Parks and Resorts

References

External links
 
 Reinhard's Edaville Website

2 ft gauge railways in the United States
Amusement parks in Massachusetts
Heritage railroads in Massachusetts
Narrow gauge railroads in Massachusetts
Railroads of amusement parks in the United States
Street railway museums in the United States
Tourist attractions in Plymouth County, Massachusetts
Transportation in Plymouth County, Massachusetts